José Luis Carrasco Gamiz (born 27 April 1982 in Jaén) is a Spanish former professional road bicycle racer.

Palmarès 

 2004
 1st, Stage 2, Volta a Lleida, La Sau D'urgell
 2005
 1st, Mountains classification, Tirreno–Adriatico
 2008
 1st, Stage 6, Volta a Catalunya, Barcelona

External links 

Spanish male cyclists
1982 births
Living people
Sportspeople from Jaén, Spain
Cyclists from Andalusia